Armin Emrich (born 16 June 1951) is a former German team handball player, and former head coach for the German women's national handball team. As coach he led the German team to bronze medal in the 2007 World Women's Handball Championship.

References

1951 births
Living people
German male handball players
German handball coaches